Gerald James Michael Gazdar, FBA (born 24 February 1950) is a British linguist and computer scientist.

Education
He was educated at Heath Mount School, Bradfield College, the University of East Anglia (BA, 1970) and the University of Reading (MA, PhD).

Career and research
Gazdar was appointed a lecturer at the University of Sussex in 1975, and became Professor of Computational Linguistics there in 1985. He retired in 2002.

Gazdar defined Linear Indexed Grammars and pioneered, along with his colleagues Ewan Klein, Geoffrey Pullum and Ivan Sag, the framework of Generalized Phrase Structure Grammars.

References

1950 births
Living people
People educated at Heath Mount School
People educated at Bradfield College
Alumni of the University of East Anglia
Alumni of the University of Reading
Academics of the University of Sussex
Syntacticians
Linguists from the United Kingdom
Fellows of the British Academy